The J/30 is a racer/cruiser sailing keelboat developed and built by J/Boats to provide more comfort for coastal cruising while maintaining a high level of sailing performance to make for a competitive racer.

Although the majority of boats are located on the United States east coast, there are fleets across the country and J/30's can be found around the world.  Built to be competitive around the buoys, there are active fleets from the gulf coast to the north east which hold regular One-Design racing, culminating in a North American Championship held in the fall of every year.

History
Following on the enormous success of the J/24, Rod Johnstone designed the J/30 to motivate and sustain participation in the sport of sailing by the entire family.  Introduced in 1979, the aim was to build a boat that would be comfortable for a family to cruise or daysail without compromising speed and performance. By striking this balance, the J/30 is a competitive racer that can be comfortably handled by sailors of all age and experience levels. The J/30 ceased production with hull number 545, built in 1986.

Authority, rules and regulations
The national authority for the class is the J/30 National Class Association. The Class Association maintains a strict set of rules for One-Design racing with the goal of keeping costs down for the amateur sailors that comprise the class.  The Class Association also serves as a resource for owners and crew interested in learning more about the class.  Current one design rules can be found on the web.

1979 Fastnet Race
The J/30 was noted for its performance during the legendary, and tragic, 1979 Fastnet race.  The 1979 Fastnet was besieged by a series of storms, resulting in 15 fatalities.  Hull number 10, named Juggernaut, was shipped to England, where it was entered in the race.  Hull number 29 was being single handed from Bermuda to England by Bill Wallace, getting caught in the storm as it entered the English Channel.  With winds reaching Force 9 on the Beaufort Scale, the two J/30's weathered the storms, being described as "the best . . . sailboat in the world for its intended purpose."

See also
 Cal 9.2 
 J/22
 J/24
 J/27
 J/105
 Kirby 30
 Santana 30/30

References

External links

 J/30 Class Association Website
 J-Boat Website

Sailing yachts
1970s sailboat type designs
Sailboat type designs by Rod Johnstone
Sailboat types built by J/Boats